Patiala State was a self-governing princely state of the British Empire in India, and one of the Phulkian States, that acceded to the Union of India upon Indian independence and partition. Patiala Kingdom/State was founded by Sidhu Jat Sikhs. 

Early proposals of a Sikh nation of ‘Sikhistan’ led by Maharaja of Patiala were published by Dr VS Bhatti in 1940 for a “Khalistan led by the Maharaja of Patiala with the aid of a cabinet consisting of representative federating units.”. These would consist of the central districts of Punjab province then directly administered by the British, including Ludhiana, Jalandhar, Ambala, Ferozpur, Amritsar and Lahore; the 'princely states' of the Cis-Sutlej, including Patiala, Nabha, Faridkot and Malerkolta; and the 'Shimla Group' of states. After partition of India in 1947, The Liberator, a Sikh publication advocated for Khalistan which would include East Punjab merged with PEPSU led by Maharaja of Patiala as it’s Monarch.

Etymology 
The state's name came from the name of its principal city and capital, Patiala, which itself comes from the roots patti and ala. The word patti means "strip of land" in Punjabi, and 'ala' comes from the name of the founder of the city and Patiala state, Ala Singh, thus meaning ‘the land of Ala Singh’

Brief history

In 1763, the Sikh confederation captured the fortress of Sirhind

Rulers

The rulers of Patiala bore the title 'Maharaja-e Rajgan' from 1810 onward.

Maharajas
29 Mar 1761 – 22 August 1765: Ala Singh (b. 1691 – d. 1765)
22 Aug 1765 – 1767:Amar Singh (b. 1748 – d. 1781)

Raja-e Rajgan
1767 – 5 February 1781: Amar Singh (s.a.)
Feb 1781 – 1810: Sahib Singh (b. 1774 – d. 1813)

Maharaja-e Rajgan
1810 – 26 March 1813: Sahib Singh (s. a.)
26 Mar 1813 – 23 December 1845: Karam Singh (b. 1797 – d. 1845)
26 Mar 1813 – 1823: Maharani Aus Kaur (f) – Regent (b. 1772 – d. af.1823)
23 Dec 1845 – 13 November 1862: Narendra Singh (b. 1823 – d. 1862) (from 25 June 1861 Sir Narendra Singh)
13 Nov 1862 – 14 April 1876: Mahendra Singh  (b. 1852 – d. 1876) (from 28 May 1870 Sir Mahendra Singh)
13 Nov 1862 – 26 February 1870: Jagdish Singh (Regent, chairman of regency council)
14 Apr 1876 – 9 November 1900: Rajinder Singh (b. 1872 – d. 1900) (from 21 May 1898 Sir Rajendra Singh)
14 April 1876 – Oct 1890: Sir Deva Singh (Regent) (b. 1834 – d. 1890) (chairman of regency council)
9 November 1900 – 23 March 1938:  Bhupinder Singh  (b. 1891 – d. 1938) (from 12 December 1911 Sir Bhupindra Singh)
9 November 1900 – 3 November 1910: Sardar Gurmukh Singh – (Regent, chairman of regency council)
23 Mar 1938 – 15 August 1947: Yadavindra Singh  (b. 1913 – d. 1974) (from 1 January 1942 Sir Yadavindra Singh)

Demographics

Religion

Gallery

See also
 Maharaja of Patiala
Patiala State Monorail Trainways
 Political integration of India
 Phulkian sardars
 Nabha State
 Jind State
 Faridkot State
 Malaudh
 Bhadaur
 Kaithal
 Cis-Sutlej states
 Nanu Singh Saini

Notes

References 
2.https://dsal.uchicago.edu/reference/gazetteer/pager.html?objectid=DS405.1.I34_V20_046.gif

Further reading 

Princely states of Punjab
Patiala
History of Punjab, India
1763 establishments in India
1947 disestablishments in India